Group F of the 2021 Africa Cup of Nations took place from 12 to 20 January 2022. The group consisted of debutants the Gambia, as well as Mali, Mauritania and Tunisia.

Mali and Gambia as the top two teams, along with Tunisia as one of the four best third-placed teams, advanced to the round of 16.

Teams

Notes

Standings

Matches

Tunisia vs Mali

Mauritania vs Gambia

Gambia vs Mali

Tunisia vs Mauritania

Gambia vs Tunisia

Mali vs Mauritania

Notes

References

External links
 

2021 Africa Cup of Nations